Bohemia After Dark is an album by jazz drummer Kenny Clarke, featuring the earliest recordings with Cannonball Adderley and Nat Adderley. It was released by Savoy Records in September 1955.

The album, and its first track, are titled after the Café Bohemia a restaurant where, between 1955 and 1960, jazz live sessions were held.

Reception
The Allmusic review by Scott Yanow states: "Although drummer Kenny Clarke is the nominal leader and the other sidemen include trumpeter Donald Byrd, Jerome Richardson on tenor and flute, pianist Horace Silver and bassist Paul Chambers, the impressive performance by the young Adderleys makes this a historic session that has often been reissued under Cannonball's name".

Track listing 
All compositions by Julian "Cannonball" Adderley & Nat Adderley, except where indicated.
 "Bohemia After Dark" (Oscar Pettiford) - 6:06  
 "Chasm" - 4:18  
 "Willow Weep for Me" (Ann Ronell) - 6:18  
 “Late Entry" - 6:56
 "Hear Me Talkin' to Ya" - 3:12  
 "With Apologies to Oscar" - 9:06  
 "We'll Be Together Again" (Carl T. Fischer, Frankie Laine) - 5:42  
 Recorded on June 28 (tracks 1-5 & 7), and July 14 (track 6), 1955

Personnel 
 Kenny Clarke - drums
 Cannonball Adderley - alto saxophone feature track 3
 Nat Adderley – cornet feature track 7
 Donald Byrd - trumpet tracks 1,2 and 5
 Jerome Richardson - tenor saxophone, or flute tracks 1,2 and 4
 Horace Silver -  piano (tracks 1-5 and 7)
 Hank Jones - piano (track 6)
 Paul Chambers - bass

References 

1955 albums
Savoy Records albums
Kenny Clarke albums
Albums recorded at Van Gelder Studio
Albums produced by Ozzie Cadena